Baist Khel is a town and union council in Lakki Marwat District of Khyber-Pakhtunkhwa. It is located at 32°43'9N 70°45'29E and has an altitude of 269 metres (885 feet).

See also
Battle of Ahmed Khel

References

Union councils of Lakki Marwat District
Populated places in Lakki Marwat District